Mentawai may refer to:
 Mentawai Islands
 Mentawai Strait
 Mentawai people
 Mentawai language

Language and nationality disambiguation pages